The Microregion of São Carlos is a microregion located on the east-center of São Paulo state, Brazil, and is made up of 6 municipalities. It belongs to the Mesoregion of Araraquara.

The population of the Microregion is 308,777 inhabitants, in an area of 3,185.4 km²

Municipalities 
The microregion consists of the following municipalities, listed below with their 2010 Census populations (IBGE/2010):

Analândia:  4,293
Descalvado: 31,056
Dourado: 8,609
Ibaté: 30,734
Ribeirão Bonito: 12,135
São Carlos: 221,950

References

Sao Carlos